Duane Keith "Keefe D" Davis (born June 14, 1963) is an American member of the California-based gang known as The Southside Compton Crip. Davis, a childhood friend of legendary N.W.A. frontman Eazy-E, is alleged to have been involved in the murder of Tupac Shakur. During the early '90s, Davis built a friendly relationship with Sean "Diddy" Combs. Davis claims that in 1996, Diddy placed a $1 Million hit on Tupac and Suge Knight that eventually resulted in Tupac being fatally wounded in Las Vegas later that same year. Detective Tim Brennan from Compton, California filed an affidavit naming Davis and his nephew Orlando Anderson as suspects, although fans and others have speculated as to their involvement in the killing. Neither have ever been charged with the murder; Anderson was killed in a gang-related shootout in 1998.

Murder of Tupac Shakur 

On the night of September 7, 1996, Shakur, his entourage and Anderson were involved in a fight inside the MGM Grand Hotel in Las Vegas three hours before Shakur's shooting. In September, Las Vegas homicide Lt. Larry Spinosa told the media, "At this point, Orlando Anderson is not a suspect in the shooting of Tupac Shakur." Eventually in the investigation, Anderson was named a suspect along with his uncle. Stories circulated on the street that Anderson bragged about shooting the rapper, which he denied in an interview for VIBE magazine later. Anderson was detained in Compton a month after the shooting with 21 other alleged gang members. Anderson was not charged. However, the raid was only tangentially connected to the Tupac shooting as Compton police said they were investigating local shootings and not the one in Las Vegas. The Las Vegas police discounted Anderson as a suspect, according to a Los Angeles Times article, because the fight, in which Shakur was involved in assaulting Orlando Anderson in the Las Vegas MGM lobby, had happened just hours before the shooting. They failed to follow up with a member of Shakur's entourage who witnessed the shooting and told Vegas police he could identify one or more of the assailants—the witness, rapper Yaki Kadafi, was killed two months later—and they also failed to follow up on a lead from a witness who had spotted a white Cadillac similar to the car from which the fatal shots were fired and in which the shooters escaped.

A year later, Afeni Shakur, Tupac's mother, filed a wrongful death lawsuit against Anderson in response to a lawsuit Anderson filed against Death Row Records CEO Suge Knight, Death Row associates, and Tupac's estate. Anderson's lawsuit sought damages for injuries resulting from the scuffle the evening of Tupac's murder, for emotional and physical pain. Afeni Shakur's lawsuit was filed just four days after Anderson's. The Associated Press reported in 2000 that Shakur's estate and Anderson's estate settled the competing lawsuits just hours before the death of Orlando Anderson. Anderson's lawyer claimed the settlement would have netted Anderson $78,000.

In September 1997, Anderson told the Los Angeles Times he was a fan of Tupac Shakur and his music, but denied having anything to do with the murder.

In October 2011, former LAPD Detective Greg Kading, a former investigator in the murder of Christopher "Biggie Smalls" Wallace, released a book alleging that Sean "Diddy" Combs commissioned Duane Keith "Keefe D" Davis to kill Tupac Shakur, as well as Suge Knight, for $1 million. Davis and Kading claimed that Anderson was present in the vehicle that pulled up next to the BMW in which Tupac was shot. In a recorded conversation with Kading, Davis claimed Anderson fired the shots that killed Tupac.

Kading's implication of Anderson was similar to allegations made in Philips's series and Scott's book. Each account said that four black men were in the white Cadillac that pulled up alongside the BMW that Knight and Tupac were riding in on the night of the shooting. The accounts independently reported that Anderson was in the back seat of the Cadillac and shot Tupac by leaning out of the back window. Kading and Philips claimed that the Crips were offered a one-million dollar bounty to kill Knight and Tupac. However, the two accounts differ on whether the bounty was offered by Combs (as reported by Kading) or by Wallace (as reported by Phillips).

2000s investigations 
In 2002, the Los Angeles Times published a two-part series by reporter Chuck Philips titled "Who Killed Tupac Shakur?" based on a series that looked into the events leading to the crime. The series indicated that "the shooting was carried out by a Compton gang called the Southside Crips to avenge the beating of one of its members by Shakur a few hours earlier. Orlando Anderson, the Crip whom Shakur had attacked, fired the fatal shots. Las Vegas police interviewed Anderson only once as a possible suspect. He was later killed in an unrelated gang shooting." The Los Angeles Times articles included reference to the cooperation of East Coast rappers including the late rapper The Notorious B.I.G., Tupac's rival at the time, and New York criminals.

Before they died, rival rap music artist The Notorious B.I.G. (also known as Biggie Smalls, who was killed on March 9, 1997) and Anderson denied a role in the murder. In support of this, Biggie's family produced computerized invoices showing that he was working in a New York recording studio the night of the drive-by shooting. His manager Wayne Barrow and fellow rapper James "Lil' Cease" Lloyd made public announcements denying Biggie had a role in the crime and stating that they were both with him in the recording studio on the night of the shooting.

The New York Times called the evidence produced by Biggie's family "inconclusive", noting:The pages purport to be three computer printouts from Daddy's House, indicating that Wallace was in the studio recording a song called Nasty Boy on the afternoon Shakur was shot. They indicate that Wallace wrote half the session, was In and out/sat around and laid down a ref, shorthand for a reference vocal, the equivalent of a first take. But nothing indicates when the documents were created. And Louis Alfred, the recording engineer listed on the sheets, said in an interview that he remembered recording the song with Wallace in a late-night session, not during the day. He could not recall the date of the session but said it was likely not the night Shakur was shot. We would have heard about it, Mr. Alfred said.Assistant managing editor of the Los Angeles Times Mark Duvoisin defended Philips' articles, stating they were based on police affidavits and court documents as well as interviews with investigators, witnesses to the crime and members of the Southside Crips. Duvoisin stated: "Philips' story has withstood all challenges to its accuracy, ... [and] remains the definitive account of the Shakur slaying." The main thrust of Philips' articles, implicating Anderson and the Crips, was later corroborated by former LAPD Detective Greg Kading's 2011 book Murder Rap and discussed in author Cathy Scott's book The Killing of Tupac Shakur. Scott claimed Biggie was not involved with the murder of Tupac in a People magazine article, saying there was no evidence pointing to Biggie Smalls as a suspect. Also, The New York Times wrote, "The Los Angeles Times articles did not offer any documentation to show that Wallace was in Las Vegas that night."

In her 2002 book (with a new edition in 2014), The Killing of Tupac Shakur, Cathy Scott reviews various theories, including the Suge Knight/Death Row theory of Tupac's murder before stating, "Years after the primary investigations, it's still anyone's guess. No one was ever arrested but no one was ever ruled out as a suspect, either." She then wrote that one theory "transcends all the others, and implicates the white-record-company power brokers themselves", implicating the bosses of the Suge Knight label. In recent years, archived letters of her responses to readers show an evolution toward Anderson as a suspect and a dismissal of the Knight theory.

Confession to the police 
In 2009 during the investigation carried out by Greg Kading, Davis was given the opportunity of a plea bargain with the LAPD against his drug dealing charges. Davis accepted and gave a statement that contained vital information such as who gave the gun to Orlando Anderson and who shot the gun. Kading originally approached Davis as a suspect in the murder of Wallace.

Confession to the public 
On July 2, 2018, Davis confessed to having a role in the killing of Tupac Shakur after revealing he was dying of cancer. He went on to say he was the passenger in the white Cadillac on the night of the incident. He refused to name the other suspects in the car but confirmed that the shooter was Orlando Anderson, his nephew, and that it was out of retaliation for getting jumped at the MGM Grand earlier and the $1 million bounty by Puff Daddy.

Biographical portrayals in film

References

External links 
 Scott, Cathy, The Killing of Tupac Shakur, Huntington Press:  (paperback 2nd ed., 2002)
 Chuck Philips, "Who Killed Tupac Shakur; Part 1
 Philips, Chuck, "Who Killed Tupac Shakur; Part 2"

1963 births
20th-century American criminals
Living people
African-American gangsters
Gangsters from Los Angeles
Gang members
Crips
Criminals from California
People from Compton, California
Tupac Shakur
Unsolved murders in the United States